The 2012–13 Moldovan "A" Division season is the 22nd since its establishment. A total of 16 teams are contesting the league.

Teams

League table

Round by round

Results

Top goalscorers
Updated to matches played on 1 June 2013.

References

External links
Divizia A - Moldova - Results, fixtures, tables and news - Soccerway

Moldovan Liga 1 seasons
2012–13 in Moldovan football
Moldova